Christian Frederick Albert John Henry David "Bruno" Betzel (December 6, 1894 – February 7, 1965) was an American infielder in Major League Baseball and a longtime manager at the minor league level. In 26 years as a minor league skipper, between the years of 1927 and 1956 (he did not manage in 1931, 1949 (when he was a scout for the New York Yankees), nor in 1954–55), Betzel compiled a record of 1,887 victories and 1,892 losses for a winning percentage of .499.

Born in Chattanooga, Ohio, a small town in Mercer County on the Indiana border, Betzel played his entire, five-year Major League career for the St. Louis Cardinals, between 1914 and 1918. A right-handed batter and thrower, he appeared in 448 games and batted .231 with 333 hits, including 37 doubles, 25 triples, two home runs and 94 runs batted in. He was the Redbirds' regular third baseman in 1915 and second baseman in 1916.

An old-time ballplayer who roomed with Rogers Hornsby in his tenure with the Cardinals, Betzel once beaned Ty Cobb with an infield ground ball that set off a rare brawl in spring training. In spite of his business-like, win at all costs baseball life, he was known to share what he hunted and fished for with orphanages near his home.

In 1927 Bruno began his managing career with the Indianapolis Indians of the Class AA American Association; the following season, he won his first pennant. He would win six more championships, all of them in the higher levels of the minor leagues, over the course of his managing career. After farm systems were adopted in the 1930s, Betzel piloted minor league affiliates of the Yankees, Brooklyn Dodgers, New York Giants and Cincinnati Reds. He was integral in the process which sent the first black player to the Major Leagues. As manager of the Jersey City Giants, whose nemesis was the Montreal Royals team, Betzel said of Jackie Robinson (Montreal's second baseman), "I don't care if he is polka-dotted, he will be a big league player", and "I'd tuck him into bed at night if necessary to have him play for me in the big leagues".

In his final season as a manager, 1956, he led the Toronto Maple Leafs to the International League pennant, although the Leafs dropped the Governors' Cup playoff series to the Rochester Red Wings in seven games.

Betzel was inducted into the International League Hall of Fame in 1957.

He died in Hollywood, Florida, at the age of 70.

According to Official Baseball 1945, Betzel was endowed with six given names to honor all six of his uncles; he gained his lifelong nickname "Bruno" after a St. Bernard Dog of his youth that used to follow him around.

References
Reichler, Joseph, ed.  The Baseball Encyclopedia.  New York: Macmillan Publishing Co., 1979.
Lloyd Johnson, ed., The Minor League Register. Durham, North Carolina: Baseball America, 1994.

External links

1894 births
1965 deaths
Baseball players from Ohio
Binghamton Triplets managers
Binghamton Triplets players
Bristol Boosters players
Durham Bulls managers
Indianapolis Indians managers
Indianapolis Indians players
Kansas City Athletics scouts
Louisville Colonels (minor league) managers
Louisville Colonels (minor league) players
Major League Baseball infielders
Montreal Royals managers
New York Yankees scouts
People from Mercer County, Ohio
St. Louis Cardinals players
Syracuse Chiefs managers
Toronto Maple Leafs (International League) managers